The French Trade Council (Conseil du Commerce de France – CdCF) is an association of twenty-eight professional federations representing both independent and franchised businesses from all sectors.

Liaison committee 
Within the CdCF, trade federations meet to express their views on issues relevant to all sectors of commerce where they pool expertise, identify issues and challenges, and determine plans of action to strengthen French trade.

Trade representation and advocacy 
From the broad issues identified by its members, the CdCF advocates for the interests of all trade professionals to the relevant French or European authorities on issues of taxation, employment, training, environment, consumption, competition, security, accessibility, etc. All these topics are dealt with in the CdCF's committees and work groups, which are places of exchange and consultation for the member federations.

Lobbying activity at the National Assembly 
The CdCF is registered as a representative of interests before the National Assembly. As such, it declared in 2014 an overall budget of €1,129,000 and indicated that the annual cost related to the direct activities of representing an interest to Parliament were between €20,000 and €30,000.

Information and expertise 
On behalf of its members the CdCF monitors legal and regulatory changes.

Presidents

See also
Trade association

References 

 « Tableau des représentants d'intérêts » [archive, sur www.assemblee-nationale.fr (consulté le 15 octobre 2016)]
 « Insee – Document recherche – La situation du commerce en 2015 – Rapport établi pour la Commission des Comptes Commerciaux de la Nation » [archive, sur www.insee.fr (consulté le 16 mars 2016)]

External links 

1945 establishments in France